Christopher Larkin is a composer for video games, film, and television, best known for his work on Hollow Knight and the upcoming sequel Hollow Knight: Silksong. Some of his other works include Pac-Man 256, Outfolded, TOHU, and Hacknet.

Education 
Larkin studied composition at Brighton Secondary School, then at the Elder Conservatorium of Music in Adelaide. His mentors were Mr. John Polglase, Prof. Charles Bodman Rae, and Prof. Graeme Koehne.

Career 
Larkin began composing music at a young age, and collaborated with filmmaking students while he attended Elder Conservatory for music. He now works as a professional composer and sound designer for visual media such as Film, TV and Video games. He often collaborates with visual artists including Ari Gibson of Team Cherry with whom he has collaborated prior to the hit indie title Hollow Knight.

Compositional Style 
In his music, Larkin integrates elements of his classical training with a diverse range of musical styles. He draws inspiration from classical composers such as Debussy as well as visual-media composers such as James Newton, Joe Hisaishi and Koji Kondo.

Larkin's most notable work, the Hollow Knight soundtrack, is characterized as conveying "dark elegance and melancholy." The soundtrack is largely orchestral and employs recurring leitmotifs throughout different tracks, each often corresponding to a location or character. Larkin also incorporated textural and instrumental themes to the score, such as using guitar harmonics to represent the glistening environment of the in-game location "Crystal Peak." He is continuing his collaboration with Team Cherry on Hollow Knight's upcoming sequel, Hollow Knight: Silksong.

For the adventure game TOHU, produced by Fireart Games, Larkin used the Digital Audio Workstation Cubase to create a musical score that reflects the game's whimsical story and visuals. His process involved observing the gameplay sent to him by the developers, and sonically interpreting those visual elements.

List of Works 
Larkin has composed music for the following productions:

Awards 
 Best Sound Design at the South Australian Screen Awards 2016
 Best Composition at the South Australian Screen Awards 2015
 ASSG Awards Best Sound for Interactive Media 2017
 Best Score at the South Australian Screen Awards 2021

References 

Living people
Video game composers
Australian composers
Year of birth missing (living people)